The Federal Ministry of the Interior is a part of the Federal Ministries of Nigeria tasked with providing complementary internal security and other ancillary services within Nigeria.

History
The concern to maintain internal security gave rise to the creation of Federal Ministry of Internal Affairs in 1957. In 2007, the Ministry of Internal Affairs merged with the Ministry of Police Affairs, resulting in the Ministry of the Interior. 

The current Minister of the Interior is Ogbeni Rauf Adesoji Aregbesola

Functions
The Ministry formulates and implements policies related to border management and supervises the National Immigration Service. 

Its other functions include: 
 Granting of Nigerian citizenship
 Consular and immigration services
 Granting of business permits and expatriate quotas
 Co-ordination of national and independence day celebrations
 Reformation and re-integration of inmates
 Security of lives and properties
 Management of National emergencies;
 Recruitment of officers and men of the Correctional Service, Immigration Service, Fire Service and the Nigeria Security and Civil Defence Corps
 Managing the retirement benefits of retirees of paramilitary Services under its supervision.

List of Ministers

*Minister of Internal Affairs

References

External links
 http://interior.gov.ng/

Federal Ministries of Nigeria